Jönssonligan dyker upp igen (English: The Johnson Gang Resurface or The Return of the Johnson Gang) is a 1986 Swedish comedy film, one of a series of films made about Jönssonligan, a gang of criminals.

This was the first Swedish film in the series with an original script, not based on an original Olsen-banden film.

Cast 
 Gösta Ekman as Charles-Ingvar "Sickan" Jönsson
 Ulf Brunnberg as Ragnar Vanheden
 Björn Gustafson as Dynamit-Harry Kruth
 Birgitta Andersson as Doris
 Per Grundén as Morgan Wall-Enberg
 Johannes Brost as "Järnarmen" ("The Iron-Arm")
 Lars Dejert as "Biffen" ("The Beef")
 Kent Andersson as Insp. Persson
 Dan Ekborg as Police assistant
 John Harryson as Russian submarine captain

External links 

Danish comedy films
Swedish comedy films
Jönssonligan films
1986 films
Films directed by Mikael Ekman
1980s Swedish films